The 2014–15 season is FC Sheriff Tiraspol's 18th season, and their 17th in the Divizia Naţională, the top-flight of Moldovan football.

Squad

Out on loan

Transfers

In

Out

Loans in

Loans out

Released

Competitions

Moldovan Super Cup

Divizia Națională

Results summary

Results

League table

Moldovan Cup

UEFA Champions League

Qualifying rounds

UEFA Europa League

Qualifying rounds

Squad statistics

Appearances and goals

|-
|colspan="14"|Players who left Sheriff Tiraspol during the season:

|-
|colspan="14"|Players who appeared for Sheriff Tiraspol no longer at the club:

|}

Goal scorers

Disciplinary record

References

External links 
 

 
Moldovan football clubs 2014–15 season
FC Sheriff Tiraspol seasons